Gujranwala railway station is located in Gujranwala city, Gujranwala district of Punjab province of the Pakistan. Gujranwala is the 5th largest city of Pakistan. Gujranwala Railway Station consists of 4 platforms. The biggest importance of this station is that it is attached to the main railway line between Karachi and Peshawar. Ministry of Railways is working for the improvement of services at this station. Gujranwala consists of 3 railways stations: Gujranwala City, Gujranwala and Gujranwala Cantt railways station.

Services
Following trains stay at Gujranwala Railway Station. Timings were synced through official website of Pakistan Railways on PST 11:50 PM June 18, 2022.

Awam Express ceased the operation as reported by Station officials on March 20, 2023.

See also
 List of railway stations in Pakistan
 Pakistan Railways

External links

Railway stations in Gujranwala District
Railway stations on Karachi–Peshawar Line (ML 1)
Tourist attractions in Gujranwala